Liu Chang (born 1 August 1990) is a former professional Chinese tennis player.

On 16 May 2016, she reached her highest WTA singles ranking of 171. On 27 February 2017, she peaked at No. 153 in the WTA doubles rankings. Chang has won three singles and eight doubles titles on tournaments of the ITF Circuit.

She won the biggest title in her career at the 2013 Beijing International Challenger, winning the doubles event with Zhou Yimiao.

ITF Circuit finals

Singles: 5 (3 titles, 2 runner–ups)

Doubles: 17 (8 titles, 9 runner–ups)

External links
 
 

1990 births
Living people
Chinese female tennis players
21st-century Chinese women